Brestovec may refer to 

Brestovec, a settlement in the Komárno District in Slovakia
Brestovec, a settlement in the Myjava District in Slovakia
Brestovec, a settlement in the Rogaška Slatina municipality in Slovenia